The Muses are the nine inspirational goddesses of literature, science, and the arts in Greek and Roman mythology. 

Muse or muses may also refer to:

Arts, entertainment and media

In general
 Muse (source of inspiration), a person who serves as a model or inspiration for, or influence on, the works of a creative artist (see also :Category:Muses)

Music
 Muse (band), an English rock band
 μ's, a J-pop group and the voice providers of Love Live!
 Muse Records, an American jazz record label
 Muse (Grace Jones album) (1979)
 Muse (Valery Leontiev album)
 Muse (Candy Lo album) (2000)
 Muse (EP), an EP by Muse
 Muse (Jolin Tsai album) (2012)

Film
 The Muse (film), a 1999 film by Albert Brooks
 The Muse (soundtrack)
 Luster (film) or Muse, a 2002 film by Everett Lewis
 Muse (2017 film), an English-language Spanish supernatural thriller film 
 Muse (2019 film), a British psychological horror film

Magazines
 Muse (children's magazine)
 Muse (Hong Kong magazine)

Other uses in arts, entertainment and media
 Muse (novel), a 2013 novel by Mary Novik
 "Muse" (Star Trek: Voyager), a 2000 episode of Star Trek: Voyager
 Muse Entertainment, Canadian independent film and television producer and service provider
 Muse, a character from DC Comics
 μ's, the protagonists of the Love Live! franchise
 Muse Communication, also known as simply Muse, a Taiwanese distributor and licensor
 The Muse, character in The Muse ARG

Education
 Mercer University School of Engineering, in Georgia, US
 Multicultural Urban Secondary English, a program at University of California, Berkeley, US

People
 Muse (surname)
 Muse Watson (born 1948), American actor

Places
 Muse, Myanmar, a town on Shweli River in Shan State, Myanmar
 Muse, Florida
 Muse, Oklahoma

Science and technology

Computing
 MusE, an open-source MIDI/audio sequencer for Linux
 MuseScore, a multiplatform scorewriter derivative
 Adobe Muse, Adobe software to write HTML code
 Muse Software, a software and computer game publisher and developer
 Project MUSE, a digital archive; website muse.jhu.edu

Spacecraft
 MUSE (spacecraft), a 2026 proposed orbiter mission to the planet Uranus
 MUSES Program, Mu Space Engineering Spacecraft

Other uses in science and technology
 Mac Muse, a Czech paraglider design
 Muse cell, a stem cell
 Multiple sub-Nyquist sampling encoding, a Japanese analog HDTV television standard
 Multi-unit spectroscopic explorer, an instrument at the Very Large Telescope
 MUSE, a brand name for Prostaglandin E1, an erectile dysfunction treatment
 Muse Laserdisc, a short-lived high-definition version of LaserDisc

Other uses
 Muse (building), a planned condo development in Sunny Isles, Florida
 Muse (clan), a Somalian clan
 Muse (headband)
 MUSE - Museo delle Scienze, a science museum in Trento, Italy
 Tokorozawa Civic Cultural Centre Muse, a concert hall complex in Tokorozawa, Japan
 Triadex Muse, an electronic digital musical instrument
 Musicians United for Safe Energy, an anti-nuclear activist group founded in 1979

See also
 The Muse (disambiguation)
 Muze
 Mews